Baeckea robusta is a species of flowering plant in the family Myrtaceae and is endemic to an area along the west coast Western Australia. It is found on sand plains and around limestone outcrops in the coastal parts of the Mid West and extending south into the north west of the Wheatbelt region of Western Australia where it grows in sandy soils over laterite or limestone.

The species was first formally described by Ferdinand von Mueller in 1864 in his book Fragmenta Phytographiae Australiae, from specimens collected near the Murchison River by Augustus Oldfield.

See also
List of Baeckea species

References

Flora of Western Australia
robusta
Plants described in 1864
Taxa named by Ferdinand von Mueller